"Reach Out for Me" is a 1963 a song written by Burt Bacharach and Hal David and originally recorded by Lou Johnson.  In the US, the original version peaked at number seventy-four on the Billboard Hot 100 the week ending December 7, 1963.

Dionne Warwick recording
In 1964, it was recorded as a track from the album Make Way for Dionne Warwick. Released as a single, it was a number twenty hit on the Billboard Hot 100 and went to number one on the Cash Box R&B chart.

Other versions
The song was also covered by British singer Michael Ball on his album Back To Bacharach.
Olivia Newton-John recorded a version for her 1989 album Warm and Tender. The song was released as the album's lead single, peaking at number 32 on the US AC chart and 153 on the ARIA Charts.
The song is also a Northern Soul classic by Roy Hamilton.

References

External links

1964 singles
1989 singles
Dionne Warwick songs
Olivia Newton-John songs
Songs with music by Burt Bacharach
Songs with lyrics by Hal David
1964 songs